Hello I.B.I  was a South Korean reality show, which aired on JTBC's cable and satellite network for comedy and variety shows. The show showcased I.B.I group members' talents and allowing fans of the group to know more about them.

Cast

Episodes

References

External links 
 

South Korean variety television shows
2016 South Korean television series debuts